37 Combat Engineer Regiment is a reserve engineer regiment of the Canadian Military Engineers, part of the Canadian Army. It has its headquarters in St John's, Newfoundland and Labrador. It parades throughout the year from September to June while training continues throughout the summer in the form of courses and taskings. It is tasked to augment the regular force when required. Currently the regiment's Commanding Officer is Lieutenant-Colonel Darren Turner and the Regimental-Sergeant-Major is Chief Warrant Officer Doug Payne.

Location
The regimental headquarters houses 56 Engineer Squadron and is located at the Surgeon Lieutenant Commander W. Anthony Paddon Building 115 the Boulevard, St. John's, NL. 1 Engineer Squadron parades out of the Carleton Street armoury in Fredericton, New Brunswick.

1 Engineer Squadron history

1 Engineer Squadron was formed in 2006 at the Carleton and York armouries in Fredericton, New Brunswick. It shares close ties to both the Canadian Forces School of Military Engineering located close by at CFB Gagetown and the 1st Battalion, The Royal New Brunswick Regiment (1 RNBR), with which it currently shares armouries.

As a new unit there has been a focus on community projects and recruiting in order to build the size of the Squadron, one of these projects was the construction of a non-standard wooden bridge as part of a trail system in New Maryland, New Brunswick. As well the unit built above ground gardening boxes for the community food bank in Oromocto, as a part of their program to provide produce grown on site by the organization.

The squadron is a highly motivated unit that benefits greatly from the close proximity of a regular Canadian Forces base and the personnel/facilities of the Engineers working on the base. This close proximity provides the squadron with unique and invaluable training opportunities.

Order of precedence

References

Engineer regiments of Canada
Military units and formations established in 2012